The 2011 Southern Conference men's basketball tournament took place between Friday, March 4 and Monday, March 7 in Chattanooga, Tennessee, at McKenzie Arena. The semifinals were televised by SportSouth, with the Southern Conference Championship Game televised by ESPN2.  The championship matched the two teams with the best conference records, College of Charleston and Wofford. Although College of Charleston had won both regular season meetings against Wofford, the Terriers defeated the Cougars in the championship game, 77–67, to secure their bid to the 2011 NCAA Men's Division I Basketball Tournament, Wofford's second straight appearance.

Standings

Tiebreakers:

Western Carolina and Chattanooga split their season series.  Western Carolina was 2–0 against third-place Appalachian State, while Chattanooga was 1–1.

College of Charleston swept the season series with Wofford, 2–0.

Bracket

Asterisk denotes game ended in overtime.

All-Tournament Team
First Team
Andrew Goudelock, College of Charleston
Donovan Monroe, College of Charleston
Jamar Diggs, Wofford
Cameron Rundles, Wofford
Noah Dahlman, Wofford

Second Team
Trent Wiedeman, College of Charleston
Jordan Miller, Furman
Amu Saaka, Furman
Harouna Mutombo, Western Carolina
Mike Williams, Western Carolina

References

External links
 SoCon Basketball Championship

Tournament
Southern Conference men's basketball tournament
Southern Conference men's basketball tournament
SoCon
Southern Conference men's basketball tournament
College sports tournaments in Tennessee
Basketball competitions in Tennessee